Saints and Soldiers is a 2003 war drama film directed by Ryan Little and produced by Little and Adam Abel. It is loosely based on events that took place after the Malmedy massacre during the Battle of the Bulge. The film stars Corbin Allred, Alexander Niver, Lawrence Bagby, and Peter Asle Holden as the four American soldiers trying to return a British soldier with vital intelligence to the Allied lines.

After conducting research on World War II and Battle of the Bulge, Little began shooting in January 2003 in Utah. Filming lasted 30 days. Little and Abel were able to save money on production by recruiting a group of World War II reenactors who volunteered their services, costumes, and props. Excel Entertainment released the film at festivals to garner publicity before it was released to the public. The movie won numerous Best Picture awards from over 15 film festivals.

Critical reception was generally positive with praise towards the message, story, performances (particularly of Allred and Niver), production values, and action sequences. Though the screenplay, pacing, and ties to Mormonism were criticized by some reviewers, several film scholars argued that despite the LDS-related themes, the film appeals to a wide audience. The film generated two sequels: Saints and Soldiers: Airborne Creed and Saints and Soldiers: The Void.

Plot
During the Battle of the Bulge in 1944, the Germans open fire on their American prisoners of war, in what is known as the Malmedy massacre, killing many troops as they try to run away. Medic Steven Gould (Alexander Niver) manages to escape with Corporal Nathan 'Deacon' Greer (Corbin Allred). Gould and Deacon are joined by two other survivors, Shirl Kendrick (Larry Bagby), a member in Gould's division, and Deacon's close friend Sergeant Gordon Gunderson (Peter Asle Holden). The four stumble on RAF pilot Flight Sergeant Oberon Winley (Kirby Heyborne). The group fights against German troops, a winter storm, and personal conflict to return Winley to Allied territory.

Cast

 Corbin Allred as Corporal Nathan "Deacon" Greer
 Alexander Niver as Private Steven Gould
 Kirby Heyborne as Flight Sergeant Oberon Winley
 Larry Bagby as Private Shirley "Shirl" Kendrick
 Peter Asle Holden as Staff Sergeant Gordon "Gundy" Gunderson
 Ethan Vincent as Rudolph Gertz
 Melinda Renee as Catherine Theary – Belgian woman
 Ruby Chase O'Neil as Sophie Theary – Catherine's daughter
 Lincoln Hoppe as German soldier

Production
Ryan Little's first project was short film The Last Good War, which won a Student Emmy. Little wanted to produce a World War II themed feature film. In 2002, new director Ryan Little teamed up with film producer Adam Abel to create the film production company, Go Films. After finding a private investor in California, Little and Abel sought to produce the film on a budget of $780,000. The original title of the film was "Saints and War". Before the film had a script, the filmmakers scouted filming locations, determining the film's plot based on available locations and props. They researched World War II events and interviewed World War II veterans to develop the story and characters.

Little and Abel quickly cast Corbin Allred and Kirby Heyborne. However, because Heyborne has appeared in many other LDS Church related movie roles, they instructed Heyborne to grow a mustache, dye his hair, use a British accent, and smoke during the movie. Because Heyborne did not smoke, he smoked herbal cigarettes in the movie and practiced dragging daily for a few weeks before filming. Additionally, Heyborne did not have access to a dialect coach so he became familiar with British accents by watching other films. Heyborne was concerned that this would make him a target for film critics. To save on costs, Little and Abel used World War II reenactors as actors who volunteered to travel to Utah and bring their World War II prop equipment at their own expense.

The film was shot in early 2003 in 30 days in Utah, Wasatch, and Salt Lake counties in Utah. Camera angles were carefully positioned to avoid showing the Wasatch mountains on camera to create the illusion of being in the Ardennes. They shot the film in January to use the available snow for their set, but they had to use potato flakes when there was not enough snow. Moreover, tight filming budgets required actors to do their own film stunts. Snow and freezing temperatures were challenges to filming, which was worsened by the period clothing costumes.

Saints and Soldiers was originally rated "R" by the MPAA, solely for war violence and related images. The director, writers, and producer wanted a rating of "PG-13". Some criticism has been leveled against the MPAA rating board with regard to their rating independent films more harshly than those of the large studios. (See also "LDS cinema and MPAA ratings".)  The MPAA never communicated to the filmmakers any specific scenes that warranted the rating though Deseret News film critic Chris Hicks speculates that the reason may be due to two scenes, one in which Nazis execute prisoners of war and another that showed a closeup of a leg wound. Producers edited the film to receive a "PG-13" rating for commercial distribution. The film was officially granted a PG-13 rating on March 30, 2004.

Historical inaccuracies
Several members of the 101st Airborne Division are depicted as being present at the massacre. In reality, the 101st was held in strategic reserve by SHAEF at this point in time to recover from combat in Operation Market-Garden. The 101st did not reach the front until December 18 (the massacre was on the 17th), and was sent to Bastogne, far to the south of where Kampfgruppe Joachim Peiper operated. Most of the victims were from the 285th Field Artillery Observation Battalion.

Release and reception
The first screening of the film was at Pearl Harbor, Hawaii, to an audience of U.S. Naval officers and their wives. The film opened at film festivals nationwide. Saints and Soldiers represents the first LDS film produced after 2000 to be exhibited in film festivals before general release to gain publicity. It was the highest-grossing film released by Excel Entertainment, an entertainment section which targets an LDS audience. It grossed over $1 million. Saints and Soldiers was released on video and DVD in May 2005. 
The reaction to Saints and Soldiers was generally positive. The Washington Times called the film, "one of the sharpest and most compelling entries of the early 'Mormon cinema' era". The New York Times wrote that the film's, "impressive cast of largely unknown actors...[and] meticulously researched film tells its story with quiet conviction". However, Variety insisted that the script had "letdowns", including anachronisms in the dialogue and other story incongruities, yet they commended the production value considering the film's low budget.

The Seattle Times added that  "the film is intended as a propaganda piece for the Church of Jesus Christ of Latter-day Saints, but the messages are very subtle, and the movie does have a place in the new WWII genre",  and is "appropriate for mainstream audiences". Furthermore, scholar Travis T. Anderson, affirmed that films made by LDS filmmakers such as Saints and Soldiers and Napoleon Dynamite can still develop "widespread attention" or "critical acclaim". He continued by stating that neither appeals to an exclusively LDS audience nor alienates non-LDS audiences. Moreover, scholar Terryl Givens argued that Saints and Soldiers can be interpreted specifically or universally. Givens claimed that the screenwriting created a film that is authentically Mormon yet reaches to a myriad of audiences. Although ties to Mormonism in the film have been criticized by some, Gideon O. Burton called the film, "among the most-praised films of the Fifth Wave [of Mormon cinema] to date".

Legacy
Saints and Soldiers won the 2004 Jury Award for Best Feature at the Stony Brook Film Festival. Furthermore, the film won the award for best picture at 13 other film festivals. The film was nominated for Best First Feature at the 20th Film Independent's Spirit Awards in 2004, losing to Garden State.

A second film, Saints and Soldiers: Airborne Creed, was released on August 17, 2012. A third film, Saints and Soldiers: The Void, was released on August 15, 2014.

References

External links
 
 

2003 films
2003 drama films
American war drama films
American World War II films
World War II films based on actual events
Western Front of World War II films
Mormon cinema
2000s war drama films
Films set in Belgium
Films set in 1944
Films about massacres
Saints and Soldiers films
Rating controversies in film
Films about the United States Army
Films shot in Utah
Harold B. Lee Library-related 21st century articles
Films directed by Ryan Little
2000s English-language films
2000s American films